Sternolophus rufipes is a species of water scavenger beetle found in India, Sri Lanka, China, South Korea and the Philippines.

Description
This large oval species has a body size of about 10.2 mm. Elytra with four distinct rows of systematic punctures. Antennae with nine segments. Prosternum highly tectiform and carinate medially. Metasternal keel glabrous and produced into a short spine posteriorly and passed to the first ventrite. On the base of middle and hind femora, there is a hydrofuge pubescence as well as in abdominal ventrites. Mesosternal keel has a small notch and long apical setae. Posterior margin of fifth ventrite is rounded.

References 

Hydrophilidae
Insects of Sri Lanka
Beetles described in 1792